"Na Na Nana Na Na" is a song by American hip hop recording artist Jim Jones, released as the second single from his fourth studio album, Pray IV Reign (2009). The song features vocals from Brittney "Bree-Beauty" Taylor and was produced by production duo ILLFONICS. The title of the song refers to "nyah nyah nyah nyah nyah nyah" the lexigraphic representation of a common children's chant often used in taunting.

Music video
The music video for the song was directed by OLIVE! and Jim Jones. A behind-the-scenes footage was released February 15, 2009. The official video was released on March 1; it features cameo appearances by members from ByrdGang and Skull Gang. The video appeared as the "New Joint of the Day" on BET's 106 & Park, on March 2. The video has an alternate ending on 106 & Park, after Jones' third verse, ByrdGang member Mel Matrix appears and raps his verse to "Man Down", a song that was featured on Jones' official mixtape, Street Religion (Heron 3:16).

Charts

Freestyles
Papoose
Cassidy
Rick Ross

References

External links
Jim Jones ft. Bree-Beauty - Na Na Nana Na Na Lyrics 

2009 singles
Jim Jones (rapper) songs
2009 songs
Columbia Records singles
MNRK Music Group singles